Royal Air Force Fairwood Common or more simply RAF Fairwood Common  is a former Royal Air Force Sector station located at Fairwood Common on the Gower Peninsula to the west of Swansea. It is now the location of Swansea Airport.

History
RAF Fairwood Common was built on what was originally common land during the Second World War. The aerodrome was declared  operational on 15 June 1941 after taking nearly a year to develop. Built as a day and night fighter station elements of the first day fighter squadron arrived on 14 June 1941 (79 Squadron equipped with Hawker Hurricane Mk.II aircraft). 
On 17 June 1941 the first night fighter squadron arrived (a flight of 600 Squadron equipped with Bristol Beaufighter Mk.II aircraft)
and by the end of June 1941 a second Hurricane equipped day fighter squadron arrived (No. 317 Polish Fighter Squadron). The aerodrome became a 10 Group RAF Fighter Command Sector Station within a few months of opening, taking on the responsibility of the air defence for the whole of South and West Wales and the protection of convoys in the Bristol and St George's Channels.

On 23 January 1942, No. 615 Squadron (County of Surrey) Auxiliary Air Force, arrived from RAF Angle, equipped with Hawker Hurricane fighters, operating there until 17 March when the squadron moved by train to Liverpool Docks, boarding the Johan van Oldenbarnevelt. On 20 March the ship moved to the Firth of Clyde and then, filled with Army and RAF personnel, on 23 March it sailed in convoy to India.

In November 1943 No. 456 Squadron RAAF arrived from RAF Colerne, equipped with a mix of de Havilland Mosquito II's and VI's. On 29 January 1944 Mosquito XVII's arrived but by the end of February the squadron had moved to RAF Ford in Sussex. 

The aerodrome fulfilled a variety of military roles during the Second World War, following which it was decommissioned by the RAF in 1949. 

The following squadrons were here at some point:

Additional units;

Current use

Renamed Fairwood Common, the aerodrome became the home of Swansea and District Flying Club and School and they hosted a number of air shows, air races and motor sports events from 1950 to 1955. In 1957 the County Borough of Swansea took over the aerodrome and on 1 June 1957 Swansea Airport was officially opened by Group Captain Douglas R S Bader, CBE, DSO and Bar, DFC and Bar. The airport was developed for commercial usage by Cambrian Airways Ltd on behalf of the local council.

See also
 List of former Royal Air Force stations

References

Citations

Bibliography

External links 

Swansea Airport - official site

Royal Air Force stations in Wales